The University of Jijel is a university, located in Jijel, Algeria.

See also 
 List of universities in Algeria

External links
 http://www.univ-jijel.dz

Jijel
Buildings and structures in Jijel Province